This is a list of the 50 largest country subdivisions and dependent territories by area (including surface water) in square kilometres.



List of the 50 largest country subdivisions by area

Second-level list 
Second-level divisions are those under first level (provinces, regions, states, etc.) and they are cities, counties or districts, but the names vary by country.

See also 
 List of countries and dependencies by area
 List of country second-level subdivisions by area
 List of country third-level subdivisions by area
 List of political and geographic subdivisions by total area
 Lists of country subdivisions by GDP
 List of country subdivisions by GDP over 200 billion US dollars
 List of first-level administrative country subdivisions by nominal GDP per capita

Notes

References 
 

Country subdivisions
Country subdivisions
Subdivisions
!